Sullucullahua (possibly from Quechua for sulluku local name for Sapindus saponaria, a tree, llawa broken glass with sharp edges) is a mountain in the Chila mountain range in the Andes of Peru, about  high . It is located in the Arequipa Region, Castilla Province, Chachas District. Sullucullahua lies northeast of Chinchón and Aceruta and southeast of Huanca.

References

Mountains of Peru
Mountains of Arequipa Region